The Commissioner's Academic Challenge (CAC) is Florida's statewide high school quiz bowl-like academic tournament. It has been held at the Grand Floridian Resort in Walt Disney World  each spring, usually in April, since 2015 (previously, it was held at the Contemporary Resort). Each county school board in Florida is asked to send a team composed of six high school students. Participating counties are separated into three divisions based on their full-time enrollment numbers for grades 9-12.

Tournament Format 

Teams compete in up to four untimed matches, with each match consisting of 1) the 5-point question round of 20 "Button" questions, followed by a 10-point Team Question, 2) the 10-point question round of 20 "Button" questions, followed by a 20-point Team Question, and 3) the 15-point round of 25 "Button" questions followed by a 30-point Team Question. Button questions are quick-response toss-ups, answered by only one team, with correct answers earning points and incorrect answers losing points. The Team Questions are written worksheets, completed by each team, requiring several minutes to complete. Teams earn points for each correct answer, and are not subject to losing points for incorrect answers as they are in Button questions. The questions asked become progressively harder in each round and cover a variety of fields including English, math, science, social studies, art, music, foreign language (French and Spanish), technology, and multi-subject.  The questions take a variety of forms, such as matching, multiple choice, fill-in-the-blank, and free response.

Only four players may compete during a given round, but coaches are allowed to make substitutions between rounds.  Most matches feature somewhere between four and six teams competing at the same time.  A panel of judges is present in each competition room to deliberate if a challenge is declared by a team. These judges are experts in their field of study. A Reader reads most of the questions, aloud, to all the teams in the competition. Some questions, such as foreign language, music, art and physics are written and are distributed on handouts, simultaneously, to all participants. Others, such as music, are played as audio tracks, and some, such as foreign language are displayed as video tracks. A Coordinating Judge manages the competition in the match, which, although untimed, generally runs about two hours.

The CAC is unlike many other quizbowl tournaments in that it is a slower-paced, more team-oriented competition.  Team members are allowed to converse with each other at all times, and instead of having individual buzzers, each team is provided with only one or two buzzers that they must share.  The CAC also differs from most tournaments in that there is no "rebounding."  This means that once a team has buzzed in on a question, that question is finished regardless of whether the team gave a correct or incorrect response.

Awards and Prizes 

At the conclusion of the tournament, the top three teams in each division receive rings from Herff Jones, while the championship and second place teams also receive trophies and medallions from the Florida High School Athletic Association.

In addition, one winning player from each of the three championship counties, and three other players selected "at large," are chosen to serve on Team Florida, which competes at the National Tournament of Academic Excellence in June.

History of CAC 

The tournament began in 1986 and changed names several times before settling on its present title in 1997.  The following is a list of winning counties:

- 2011: Held at Coronado Springs Resort
- 2015, 2016 and 2017: Held at Grand Floridian Resort
- 2019: Held at Disney's Boardwalk Inn
- 2020, 2021: Canceled due to the COVID-19 pandemic

External links 

 Official CAC website

Student quiz competitions